The 1868–69 United States Senate elections were held on various dates in various states. As these U.S. Senate elections were prior to the ratification of the Seventeenth Amendment in 1913, senators were chosen by state legislatures. Senators were elected over a wide range of time throughout 1868 and 1869, and a seat may have been filled months late or remained vacant due to legislative deadlock. In these elections, terms were up for the senators in Class 1.

The Republican Party maintained their Senate majority. Six former Confederate states were then readmitted separately from the regular election, each electing two Republicans.  This increased the Republicans' already overwhelming majority to the largest proportion of seats ever controlled by the party.

Results summary 
Senate party division, 41st Congress (1869–1871)

 Majority party: Republican (57)
 Minority party: Democratic (9)
 Other parties: (0)
 Vacant: (8)
 Total seats: 74

Change in Senate composition

Beginning of 1868

After the readmission of the Confederate states

Before the elections 
After July 16, 1868, readmission of South Carolina.

Result of the elections

Race summaries

Elections during the 40th Congress 
In these elections, the winners were seated during 1868 or in 1869 before March 4; ordered by election date.

Races leading to the 41st Congress 
In these regular elections, the winners were elected for the term beginning March 4, 1869; ordered by state.

All of the elections involved the Class 1 seats.

Elections during the 41st Congress 
There were no elections in 1869 during this Congress after March 4.

Delaware 

Interim appointed Senator James A. Bayard Jr. was elected January 19, 1869 to finish his term.

Maryland

Maryland (special) 

William Pinkney Whyte won election by an unknown margin of votes, for the Class 1 seat to fill the vacancy created by Reverdy Johnson.

Maryland (regular) 

William Thomas Hamilton won election against Thomas Swann by a margin of 9.09%, or 10 votes for the Class 1 seat.

Maryland (March special) 

Philip Francis Thomas, a Democrat, was elected in 1867, however, failed to qualify for the seat due to his support for the Confederacy. George Vickers was elected to finish the rest of the term by a margin of 17.65%, or 18 votes, for the Class 3 seat.

Minnesota 
The Minnesota U.S. Senate election was held by the state legislature on January 19, 1869, with each chamber voting separately. Republican Senator Alexander Ramsey received 16 of 21 votes in the state Senate and 36 of 44 in the state House. The legislature declared Ramsey the duly elected U.S. Senator in a joint convention on January 20, 1869. Democratic nominee Charles W. Nash was an attorney from Hastings, former state Senator for the 7th Senate District (1862-1864), and the Democratic nominee for lieutenant governor in 1865.

New York 

The election in New York was held on January 19, 1869, by the New York State Legislature.  Republican Edwin D. Morgan had been elected in February 1863 to this seat, and his term would expire on March 3, 1869. At the State election in November 1867, 17 Republicans and 15 Democrats were elected for a two-year term (1868-1869) in the State Senate. At the State election in November 1868, Democrat John T. Hoffman was elected Governor, and 75 Republicans and 53 Democrats were elected for the session of 1869 to the Assembly. The 92nd New York State Legislature met from January 5 to May 11, 1869, at Albany, New York.

The caucus of Republican State legislators met on January 16, Assemblyman John H. Selkreg presided. All 92 legislators were present. They nominated Ex-Governor Reuben E. Fenton for the U.S. Senate. The incumbent U.S. Senator Edwin D. Morgan was very keen on his re-election, but was voted down. Speaker Truman G. Younglove had held back the appointments to the standing Assembly committees until after the caucus, and subsequent election, of a U.S. Senator, and was accused by the Morgan men to have made a bargain to favor the Fenton men with appointments after the election was accomplished. After the caucus, comparing notes, the assemblymen discovered that some of the most important committee chairmanships had been promised to a dozen different members by Speaker Younglove.

Note: On the first ballot, 93 votes were cast, one too many, and it was annulled without announcing the result. The above stated result transpired unofficially. The blank vote caused some debate if the result was really invalidated by it, but it was finally agreed to take a second ballot.

The caucus of the Democratic State legislators met on January 18. State Senator Henry C. Murphy was again nominated, like in 1867.

In the Assembly, Republicans DeWitt C. Hoyt (Saratoga Co.) and James O. Schoonmaker (Ulster Co.); and Democrats James Irving (NYC), Lawrence D. Kiernan (NYC), Harris B. Howard (Rensselaer Co.), James B. Pearsall (Queens), John Tighe (Albany Co.) and Moses Y. Tilden (Columbia Co.); did not vote.

In the State Senate, Republicans Matthew Hale (16th D.) and Charles Stanford (15th D.); and Democrats Cauldwell, Thomas J. Creamer, Michael Norton (5th D.) and John J. Bradley (7th D.); did not vote.

Reuben E. Fenton was the choice of both the Assembly and the State Senate, and was declared elected.

Notes: 
The vote for Ex-Secretary of State Randall was cast by Henry C. Murphy.
The votes were cast on January 19, but both Houses met in a joint session on January 20 to compare nominations, and declare the result.

Pennsylvania 

The Pennsylvania election was held January 19, 1869. John Scott was elected by the Pennsylvania General Assembly.  The Pennsylvania General Assembly, consisting of the House of Representatives and the Senate, convened on January 19, 1869, to elect a Senator to serve the term beginning on March 4, 1869. The results of the vote of both houses combined are as follows:

|-
|-bgcolor="#EEEEEE"
| colspan="3" align="right" | Totals
| align="right" | 133
| align="right" | 100.00%
|}

West Virginia 
On February 2, 1869, the West Virginia Legislature held an election for senator to replace Peter Van Winkle. Nominated were Arthur Boreman, the first governor of West Virginia, and Daniel Lamb, a member of West Virginia's constitutional convention and former delegate. Boreman, having received majorities of the vote in both the House and Senate, was declared duly as elected senator on February 3, 1869.

See also
 1868 United States elections
 1868 United States presidential election
 1868–69 United States House of Representatives elections
 40th United States Congress
 41st United States Congress

Notes

References

Further reading
 
 
 
Members of the 41st United States Congress
Result state election 1867 in The Tribune Almanac for 1868 compiled by Horace Greeley of the New York Tribune
Result state election 1868 in The Tribune Almanac for 1869 compiled by Horace Greeley of the New York Tribune
ALBANY.; Caucus of the Republican Members of the Legislature; Reuben E. Fenton Nominated United States Senator in NYT on January 17, 1869
ALBANY.; Election of United States Senator in NYT on January 20, 1869
 Result New York State Senate in  Journal of the Senate (92nd Session) (1869; pg. 58f)
 Result New York Assembly in Journal of the Assembly (92nd Session) (1869; Vol. I, pg. 75f)
Pennsylvania Election Statistics: 1682-2006 from the Wilkes University Election Statistics Project